The Darien pocket gopher (Heterogeomys dariensis) is a species of rodent in the family Geomyidae. It is occurs in Panama and Colombia. Some authors classify it in the genus Orthogeomys, but recent research has allowed this and its related species to be classified in the genus Heterogeomys.

It includes the Thaeler's pocket gopher (H. d. thaeleri) endemic to Colombia as a subspecies. Previously, this subspecies was considered a separate species.

References

Darien pocket gopher
Rodents of Central America
Mammals described in 1912
Least concern biota of North America
Taxonomy articles created by Polbot
Taxobox binomials not recognized by IUCN